William G. Schilling (August 30, 1939 – February 28, 2019) was an American actor of film and television. He played Dr. Harold Samuels on the television series Head of the Class between 1986 and 1991.

Schilling died on February 28, 2019, at age 79.

Selected filmography

Film

Television

References

External links 
 
 Oscars in Memoriam 2020 - William G. Shilling 

1939 births
2019 deaths
20th-century American male actors
21st-century American male actors
Male actors from Philadelphia
American male film actors
American male television actors